The women's synchronized 3 metre springboard competition at 2011 World Aquatics Championships was held on July 16 with the preliminary round in the morning and the final in the evening session. These were the first gold medals awarded of the 2011 World Aquatics Championships. The top three teams advanced to the 2012 Summer Olympics.

Medalists

Results
The preliminary round was held at 10:00 local time. The final was held at 17:15.

Green denotes finalists The top twelve teams advanced to the final.

References

External links
2011 World Aquatics Championships: Women's 3 m synchro springboard entry list, from OmegaTiming.com; retrieved 2011-07-15.

Women's 3 m synchro springboard
Aqua